The supravesical fossa is a fossa bounded by the medial umbilical fold and median umbilical fold.

External links
  - "Internal surface of the anterior abdominal wall."

Abdomen